Blackford Junior-Senior High School is a public high school in Hartford City, Indiana which includes grades 7 through 12. It is part of the Blackford County School District, and is the sole public high school serving all of Blackford County.  Like the county, Blackford High School is named after Isaac Blackford.

History 

Blackford High School opened in the fall of 1969, replacing the former Hartford City High School and Montpelier High School.  Blackford High School's team colors are red, white, and black.  These colors were selected from the high schools that used to exist in the county.  Red came from the Roll Red Rollers.  White came from the Montpelier Spartans.  Black came from the Hartford City Airedales.

Athletics 
The football team won the state championship in 1974 and 1979.

Notable alumni
Kevin A. Ford, Class of 1978 -- NASA astronaut

See also
 List of high schools in Indiana
 Central Indiana Athletic Conference
 Hartford City, Indiana

References

External links

Blackford County School District

Public high schools in Indiana
Education in Blackford County, Indiana
Educational institutions established in 1969
1969 establishments in Indiana
Buildings and structures in Blackford County, Indiana